WPYA (97.3 FM) is an American radio station licensed to Gardendale, a suburb of Birmingham, Alabama, United States. It is owned by SummitMedia. It airs a hot adult contemporary format. It shares studios with six other sister stations in the Cahaba neighborhood in far southeast Birmingham, and the transmitter is based atop Red Mountain.

History
As of 2022, 97.3 is the newest full-powered station to sign on in the Birmingham market. WEDA, then licensed to Homewood, signed on with a CHR format on November 2, 1998, calling itself "Hot 97.3". Birmingham had not had a CHR station since WAPI-FM (now WJOX-FM) changed formats in 1994, and the owners were hoping to fill that niche. However, WQEN, a CHR station licensed to Gadsden, began broadcasting from a tower closer to Birmingham earlier in the year and was more successful than WEDA.

In 1999, Cox Radio purchased WEDA from the local investors who owned the station, changed the call letters to WRLR, and changed the format to active rock. The new on-air name of the station was "Real Rock 97.3". Initially, the station was moderately successful. However, a weak signal (initially, the station broadcast at 640 watts ERP) and competition from modern rock/alternative station WRAX caused WRLR to become one of the lowest rated FM stations in Birmingham.

In October 2001, sister station WODL (Oldies 106.9) unexpectedly changed its format to all 1980s music and became known as WBPT, "106-9 the Point". Cox moved the oldies format and call letters to 97.3, and the station became known as "Oldies 97.3". Once again, the weak signal of 97.3 proved to be a hindrance to the station's success. Also, the popularity of oldies stations focusing on music from the 1960s began to decline. In June 2004, the power of the station increased from 640 watts to 6,400 watts and the station's city of license was changed from Homewood to Gardendale. In July of that year, the station changed its emphasis from oldies to music strictly from the 1970s. Core artists of the station known as "70s Hit Radio, 97-3 WODL" included Chicago, the Doobie Brothers, Alice Cooper, Grand Funk Railroad, Barry Manilow, Earth, Wind and Fire, James Taylor and other 1970s Top 40 artists.

After less than three months as a 1970s oldies station, the station once again changed formats to hot country in September 2004, placing it in competition with co-owned country station WZZK-FM and cross-town rival WDXB. The station was assigned the WNCB call letters by the Federal Communications Commission on October 19, 2004.  From the time of the format switch until March 11, 2010, the station was known on the air as "New Country 97.3". On that date, it was rebranded as "97.3 The Buck".

On August 30, 2011, at 2 p.m., WNCB changed their format to sports, branded as "97.3 The Zone".  Two days later, on September 1, 2011, the station changed its call letters to WZNN, reflecting their new on-air name.

On October 17, 2011, WZNN began simulcasting all of its local programming (6-9 a.m. and 12-2 p.m.) on WTXK in Montgomery. The station dropped its affiliation with Yahoo! Sports Radio on August 20, 2012 to become the new affiliate in the Birmingham market for ESPN Radio. At that time, the station modified its branding to "ESPN Radio 97.3 the Zone". On that same day, the station signed on their HD2 subchannel, carrying the former old-school hip-hop/R&B format of WENN-AM, which remained on FM translator W270BW (1021. FM).

The station became infamous for their public courting of Paul Finebaum, who was working for rival WJOX up until January 21, 2013. The Zone then hired WJOX's former program director, Ryan Haney, before Citadel (WJOX's parent company) brought a lawsuit that kept him away from WZNN. Haney returned to WJOX in March 2013.

On July 20, 2012, Cox Radio, Inc. announced the sale of WZNN and 22 other stations to Summit Media LLC for $66.25 million. The sale was consummated on May 3, 2013.

On February 11, 2013, the station pulled the plug on its specialty programming, including "Eyes on Auburn", "Tider Insider", and "The Midnight Meltdown", for unknown reasons.

On April 2, 2013, Fourth Quarter hosts Max Howell and Tim Melton of "The 4th Quarter" resigned from the station because they were asked by the program director to be "more controversial". Max Howell posted on his Facebook that "I'm not willing to do that kind of show . . . it's not my style and never has been."

On May 6, 2013, the station cancelled the popular late morning Straight Talk show featuring Matt Coulter and former Alabama head basketball coach Wimp Sanderson.  This was the first major programming change after the station's sale to Summit Media became final on May 3, 2013. Other shows at the time included the "Smashmouth Radio Network" with Kevin Scarbinsky and Scott Griffin in morning drive, "The Sports Czars" with Speedy, Greg and Helmsey at midday, The Sports Zone with Matt Coulter and Kip Keefer in afternoon drive, and the Eli and Stan Show with Eli Gold and Stan White.

On June 25, 2013, the Birmingham News reported that the station would drop sports talk for an unannounced format on June 28. On that day, at 2 p.m., the station began stunting with Hawaiian music, branded as "97.3 Hula FM". At midnight on July 4, the stunting switched to patriotic music, branded as "The Pledge". At 12:45 a.m. on July 5, the station shifted to adult hits, branded as "Y'all 97.3". However, "Y'all" was considered to be another form of stunting, as the station aired little to no on-air imaging, as well as a very short playlist that was repeated every couple of hours. The "stunt" lasted nearly  months, although the playlist expanded significantly.

On November 15, 2013, WZNN began simulcasting on WENN as "102.1 Y'all FM" (with translator W271BN 102.1 FM), which resulted in the discontinuation of the "Power" old school hip-hop/R&B format after nearly two years. The "Y'all" adult hits format moved to WENN and W271BN on November 21, when WZNN switched to a permanent soft adult contemporary format, branded as "Easy 97.3". It adopted the call sign WEZZ-FM on November 26, 2013.

On October 24, 2014, WEZZ and rival WMJJ flipped to Christmas music within minutes of each other. WEZZ became the third station in the United States to flip to Christmas music during the 2014 holiday season, following WMJJ and WEZW in New Jersey.  It resumed its regular format on December 26 of the same year.

On March 14, 2016, at 3 p.m., WEZZ-FM changed their format to hot adult contemporary, branded as "97.3 Play". The station changed its callsign to the current WPYA on March 21, 2016.

On April 1, 2021, WPYA picked up the rights to air The Ace & TJ Show in Birmingham after 19 years on longtime affiliate WQEN. When they began airing the show on April 5, they rebranded as "Mix 97.3", becoming the third and final former "Play" station to rebrand after sister stations WVEZ in Louisville and WURV in Richmond. WPYA also changed its slogan to "The Best Mix of 2K and Today While You Work".

Previous logos

References

External links

PYA
Radio stations established in 1998
Hot adult contemporary radio stations in the United States
Adult top 40 radio stations in the United States
1998 establishments in Alabama